Robert Grosvenor may refer to:

Sir Robert Grosvenor, 6th Baronet (1695–1755), English Member of Parliament
Robert Grosvenor, 1st Marquess of Westminster (1767–1845), English Member of Parliament
Robert Grosvenor, 1st Baron Ebury (1801–1893), British courtier and Whig politician
Robert Grosvenor, 2nd Baron Ebury (1834–1918), British politician
Robert Grosvenor, 5th Duke of Westminster (1910–1979), British soldier, landowner, businessman and politician
Robert Grosvenor, 5th Baron Ebury (1914–1957), British politician
Lord Robert Edward Grosvenor, the fourth son of Hugh Grosvenor, 1st Duke of Westminster
Robert Grosvenor (aviator) (1895–1953), World War I flying ace
Robert Grosvenor (artist) (born 1937), American sculptor